Green Room is a 2015 American horror-thriller film written and directed by Jeremy Saulnier, and produced by Neil Kopp, Victor Moyers and Anish Savjani. Starring Anton Yelchin, Imogen Poots, Alia Shawkat, Joe Cole, Callum Turner and Patrick Stewart, the film focuses on a punk band who find themselves attacked by neo-Nazi skinheads after witnessing a murder at a remote club in the Pacific Northwest. The film came from Saulnier's desire to direct a thriller set in a green room.

Principal photography took place during October 2014 in Portland, Oregon. The film was financed and produced by Broad Green Pictures. Green Room was screened in the Directors' Fortnight section at the 2015 Cannes Film Festival. At the 2015 Toronto International Film Festival, the film finished third in the balloting for the Grolsch People's Choice Midnight Madness Award. The film began a limited release on April 15, 2016, before being widely released on May 13 through A24. It appeared on many critics' lists as one of the best films of 2016 and received a 2017 Empire Award nomination for Best Horror, but grossed just $3 million against a budget of $5 million.

Plot
D.C. punk band the Ain't Rights—Pat, Sam, Reece, and Tiger—are travelling the Pacific Northwest, low on funds. After their gig is cancelled, a radio host arranges a new show in a rural area outside Portland through his cousin, Daniel. Arriving at the venue, they realize it's a neo-Nazi skinhead bar and they're opening for an NSBM band, Cowcatcher. They go ahead with the show anyway. During their set, Pat notes two young women, Emily and Amber, looking disturbed and being shepherded out of sight.

As the band is about to leave, Pat returns to the bar's green room to retrieve Sam's cellphone, where he stumbles upon Amber and the members of Cowcatcher standing over the body of Emily, who's been stabbed to death by Werm. Pat calls the police as he flees, but is caught, and bar employees Gabe and Big Justin capture the rest of the band and confine them in the green room with Amber. Gabe pays one young skinhead to stab another to create a cover story for the police who respond to Pat's call. He consults with the bar's owner, skinhead leader Darcy, who decides all witnesses need to be eliminated. He arranges for Cowcatcher to be gifted poisoned heroin, while more skinheads assemble at the bar, waiting until nightfall to kill the band and Amber.

The band overpowers Big Justin and holds him hostage, taking his pistol and a boxcutter from his pocket. They negotiate through the door with Darcy, who asks them to surrender the pistol. Pat agrees, on the condition that they keep the bullets, but when he opens the door, the men attempt to force their way in while slashing at his arm. They manage to close the door, but Pat loses the gun and is seriously injured. Big Justin attempts to break free, leading Reece to choke him unconscious. Amber slashes Big Justin's stomach open with the boxcutter.

The band tears up the floorboards and discovers a drug lab under the bar, but the only exit is locked from the outside. Arming themselves with improvised weapons, they attempt to fight their way out. Neo-Nazi Clark unleashes a fighting dog which kills Tiger. Amber and Pat drive the dog away with microphone feedback. Reece escapes through a window, only to be stabbed to death by Alan. Pat, Amber, and Sam retreat to the green room.

Daniel arrives and Darcy sends him in to kill the remaining survivors, claiming they murdered Emily, his girlfriend. However, he instead talks to them, and Amber explains that Werm murdered Emily after discovering she and Daniel were planning to leave the skinhead life. Daniel agrees to help them escape, but as they venture back out into the bar, he is shot dead by the bartender. Pat kills the bartender and the group takes his shotgun, only to find themselves confronted by the full skinhead force. Sam mortally wounds Clark's dog with the shotgun before it kills her, and Amber is shot as she and Pat once again retreat to the green room.

With the sun rising soon, Darcy has most of the skinheads disperse, taking Clark and Alan with him to stage the band's deaths to make it look as if they were killed while trespassing on his property. Gabe prepares to clean up the bar, while Jonathan and Kyle are dispatched with another dog to finish off Pat and Amber, who formulate a plan for a last stand. They again use microphone feedback to scare off the dog before Pat lures Jonathan into the drug lab. As Kyle stands watch in the green room, Amber emerges from under the cushions of the couch and ambushes him, cutting his throat with the boxcutter. Pat and Jonathan fight, and Amber sneaks up and shoots Jonathan in the head. Gabe enters the green room to find his companions dead, and surrenders to Pat and Amber.

Holding Gabe at gunpoint, they trek through the woods. As they near Darcy's house, Pat and Amber decide to go after him, while Gabe goes to a nearby farm to call the authorities. Pat and Amber confront Darcy, killing Clark and Alan. Fleeing, Darcy draws Big Justin's pistol but is shot dead. Their ammunition gone, Pat and Amber sit on the side of the road. Alarmed at the return of Clark's dog, they watch it lay beside his body mournfully and leave it alone. Energy spent, they wait for the police.

Cast
 Anton Yelchin as Pat, the bassist of the Ain't Rights
 Imogen Poots as Amber, Emily's friend 
 Alia Shawkat as Sam, the guitarist of the Ain't Rights
 Joe Cole as Reece, the drummer of the Ain't Rights
 Callum Turner as Tiger, the singer of the Ain't Rights
 Patrick Stewart as Darcy Banker, the leader of the skinheads 
 Macon Blair as Gabe, a skinhead and club employee
 Mark Webber as Daniel, a skinhead and Tad's cousin in a relationship with Emily 
 Kai Lennox as Clark, a skinhead and dogfight breeder
 Eric Edelstein as Big Justin, a skinhead bouncer
 David W. Thompson as Tad, a radio host and promoter
 Brent Werzner as Werm, a member of Cowcatcher
 Taylor Tunes as Emily, a female skinhead and Amber's friend
 Samuel Summer as Jonathan, a skinhead
 Mason Knight as Kyle, a skinhead
 Colton Ruscheinsky as Alan, a skinhead
 Jacob Kasch as the bartender

Production
The film came from Saulnier's desire to create a thriller set in a green room, calling the idea "an obsession".  Saulnier created a short film set in one as part of a 48-hour film challenge in 2007 which involved the supernatural and according to Saulnier was "Really kind of fun and hammy." However, he still wanted a chance to do his green room movie "the right way". Although the film features a large amount of violence and what Saulnier calls "full frontal gore", he has gone on record as stating that it is not "sadistic", and that every act of violence apart from the initiating incident is done with a reason.  As such Saulnier made sure that there were no "gratuitous close ups" of recently deceased characters.

On May 22, 2014, it was announced that Broad Green Pictures would finance and produce the film directed and written by Jeremy Saulnier, with Film Science. Anish Savjani, Neil Kopp and Victor Moyers would produce the film. On October 16, Anton Yelchin and Imogen Poots joined the lead cast of the film, along with Alia Shawkat, Callum Turner, Joe Cole, Macon Blair and Mark Webber. On October 21, Patrick Stewart was added to the cast to play Darcy Banker, the leader of a violent white supremacist group, while other cast includes Kai Lennox, Eric Edelstein and Taylor Tunes.

Filming
Principal photography began in October 2014 in Portland, Oregon. The location for Tad's house was in Astoria, Oregon, on the Oregon coast, and the forest scenes were filmed in the Mount Hood National Forest.

Music
Saulnier, who used to play in a hardcore punk band called "No Turn on Fred," wanted the film to "stand the test of real musicians scrutinizing every frame." He enlisted Hutch Harris of American indie rock band The Thermals to teach the actors the musical parts that they would be performing onscreen. The film's soundtrack is largely populated by heavy metal artists like Midnight rather than white nationalist bands. Saulnier says that he wanted the club to have a Motörhead-like atmosphere, but that he had no intention of financially supporting white nationalist artists.

Soundtrack 

In addition to the songs appearing on the soundtrack, Green Room features several other punk and metal tracks, including Fear's "Legalize Drugs" (1995), Napalm Death's "Suffer the Children" (1990), Obituary's "Paralyzed with Fear" (2014), Poison Idea's "Taken By Surprise" (1990), Slayer's "War Ensemble" (1990), and Bad Brains' "Right Brigade" (1982).

Release

Box office
On October 29, 2014, WestEnd Films acquired the international rights to the film. The film had its world premiere at the Cannes Film Festival on May 17, 2015. Shortly after, it was announced A24 had acquired distribution rights to the film. The film screened on opening night of the 2015 Toronto International Film Festival, on September 10, 2015.

The film was originally to open in a limited release on April 1, 2016, before opening in a wide release on April 15, 2016. However, it was moved to April 15, in limited release, and May 13 wide. According to Box Office Mojo, Green Room opened at #30 in its limited release, premiering in 3 theaters, culminating over $87,984. In its official wide release, the film premiered at 777 theaters, taking the #16 rank on opening weekend, and grossing more than $411,376.

Critical response
On review aggregator website Rotten Tomatoes the film holds an approval rating of 90% based on 245 reviews, with an average rating of 7.7/10. The site's critical consensus reads: "Green Room delivers unapologetic genre thrills with uncommon intelligence and powerfully acted élan." Metacritic reports a weighted average score of 79 out of 100, based on 42 critics, indicating "generally favorable reviews".

Richard Roeper of the Chicago Sun-Times praised Patrick Stewart, Imogen Poots, Alia Shawkat and Macon Blair's performances and called the film "a wonderfully nasty, gruesome, jagged-edge gem of a horror film" that has "first-rate" cinematography, set design, soundtrack, and editing. Barry Hertz of The Globe and Mail awarded it a full four stars and wrote, "Jeremy Saulnier (Murder Party, Blue Ruin) continues one of the best streaks in independent horror with this terrifying and inventive thriller." Lenika Cruz of The Atlantic said it's "a tense gore-fest, one that’s as grimy and claustrophobic as the titular room. But scrape off the scum, and you’ll find Green Room full of visual artistry, dark humor, smart writing, and glints of humanity". IGN awarded it a score of 9 out of 10, saying, "This follow-up to the brilliant Blue Ruin pits a rock band against white supremacists with ace, ultra-violent results."

Jeffrey Bloomer of Slate favorably compared the film's "genre maturity", "amoral survivalism and malleable sense of good and evil", "brutal efficiency" and "weary humor" to John Carpenter's Assault on Precinct 13 and praised the cast, writing "If the world knows any justice[...] then the Screen Actors Guild will remember this cast when it doles out its awards next year". James Berardinelli concludes the film is "for anyone who enjoys sitting through 90 tense minutes and feeling the attendant adrenaline rush. It’s like a well-constructed horror movie" that's "As intimate as it is unnerving". Guy Lodge of Variety called it "a technically sharp backwoods horror-thriller that lacks a human element".  Leslie Felperin of The Hollywood Reporter wrote that it's entertaining but "less disciplined, less original and less memorable work than Blue Ruin".

Accolades

Top ten lists
Green Room was listed on many film critics' top ten lists.

 2nd – Josh Bell, Las Vegas Weekly
 3rd – Nick Schager, Esquire
 3rd – Jesse Hassenger, The A.V. Club
 4th – Eric D. Snider, Salt Lake City Weekly
 4th – A.A. Dowd, The A.V. Club
 4th – Katie Rife, The A.V. Club
 4th – Rob Hunter, Film School Rejects
 5th – Steve Davis, The Austin Chronicle
 5th – Noel Murray, The A.V. Club
 5th – Jacob Oller, RogerEbert.com
 5th – Alan Zilberman, rogerebert.com
 6th – Andrew Wright, Salt Lake City Weekly
 6th – Mark Dujsik, rogerebert.com
 7th – Marc Doyle, Metacritic
 7th – Haleigh Foutch, Collider
 7th – Jen Yamato, The Daily Beast
 7th – Sean Mulvihill, rogerebert.com
 8th – David Chen, /Film
 8th – Jacob Hall, /Film
 9th – Josh Kupecki, The Austin Chronicle
 9th – Robert Horton, Seattle Weekly
 9th – Jason Bailey, Flavorwire
 10th – Vince Mancini, Uproxx

Home media
Lionsgate, as the home media distributor of A24 releases, released Green Room on Blu-ray and DVD on July 12, 2016. The end credits of the film's home media and subsequent releases feature an addended dedication to the memory of star Yelchin, who died on June 19, 2016.

References

External links

 
 
 
 
 

2015 films
2015 horror films
2015 horror thriller films
American independent films
American horror thriller films
Films directed by Jeremy Saulnier
Films shot in Oregon
Films shot in Astoria, Oregon
Films shot in Portland, Oregon
Films set in Oregon
2010s psychological films
Films about neo-Nazism
Siege films
American survival films
Broad Green Pictures films
A24 (company) films
Punk films
2015 independent films
Skinhead films
Films about musical groups
2010s action horror films
2010s English-language films
2010s American films